Scott Gordon McKay (born January 26, 1972) is a Canadian retired professional ice hockey right winger who played in one National Hockey League game for the Mighty Ducks of Anaheim during the 1993–94 NHL season. In his only game, on April 9, 1994, he played against the Vancouver Canucks, he was credited with 1 shot on goal, but failed to register a point. After the game, he played in various minor leagues, as well as in the Alpenliga in 1996-1997. He retired in 1998.

Career statistics

Regular season and playoffs

See also
List of players who played only one game in the NHL

External links

1972 births
Living people
Baltimore Bandits players
Canadian ice hockey right wingers
Carolina Monarchs players
EC Graz players
Greensboro Monarchs players
Ice hockey people from Ontario
London Knights players
Louisiana IceGators (ECHL) players
Mighty Ducks of Anaheim players
Port Huron Border Cats players
Raleigh IceCaps players
San Diego Gulls (IHL) players
Sportspeople from Burlington, Ontario
Undrafted National Hockey League players
Canadian expatriate ice hockey players in Austria